Upper class in modern societies is the social class composed of people who hold the highest social status, usually are the wealthiest members of class society, and wield the greatest political power. According to this view, the upper class is generally distinguished by immense wealth which is passed on from generation to generation. Prior to the 20th century, the emphasis was on aristocracy, which emphasized generations of inherited noble status, not just recent wealth.

Because the upper classes of a society may no longer rule the society in which they are living, they are often referred to as the old upper classes, and they are often culturally distinct from the newly rich middle classes that tend to dominate public life in modern social democracies. According to the latter view held by the traditional upper classes, no amount of individual wealth or fame would make a person from an undistinguished background into a member of the upper class as one must be born into a family of that class and raised in a particular manner to understand and share upper class values, traditions, and cultural norms. The term is often used in conjunction with terms like upper-middle class, middle class, and working class as part of a model of social stratification.

Historical meaning

Historically in some cultures, members of an upper class often did not have to work for a living, as they were supported by earned or inherited investments (often real estate), although members of the upper class may have had less actual money than merchants. Upper-class status commonly derived from the social position of one's family and not from one's own achievements or wealth. Much of the population that composed the upper class consisted of aristocrats, ruling families, titled people, and religious hierarchs. These people were usually born into their status and historically there was not much movement across class boundaries.
  
In many countries, the term "upper class" was intimately associated with hereditary land ownership. Political power was often in the hands of the landowners in many pre-industrial societies despite there being no legal barriers to land ownership for other social classes. Upper-class landowners in Europe were often also members of the titled nobility, though not necessarily: the prevalence of titles of nobility varied widely from country to country. Some upper classes were almost entirely untitled, for example, the Szlachta of the Polish–Lithuanian Commonwealth.

Great Britain and Ireland

In the United Kingdom and Republic of Ireland (before and after its independence from the United Kingdom in 1922), the "upper class" traditionally comprised the landed gentry and the aristocracy of noble families with hereditary titles. The vast majority of post-medieval aristocratic families originated in the merchant class and were ennobled between the 14th and 19th centuries while intermarrying with the old nobility and gentry. Since the Second World War, the term has come to encompass rich and powerful members of the managerial and professional classes as well.

United States

In the United States, the upper class, as distinguished from the rich, is often considered to consist of those families that have for many generations enjoyed top social status based on their leadership in society -- also referred to as old money. In this respect, the US differs little from countries such as the UK where membership of the 'upper class' is also dependent on other factors. In the United Kingdom, it has been said that class is relative to where you have come from, similar to the United States where class is more defined by who as opposed to how much; that is, in the UK and the US people are born into the upper class. The American upper class is estimated to constitute less than 1% of the population. By self-identification, according to this 2001–2012 Gallup Poll data, 98% of Americans identify with the 5 other class terms used, 48–50% identifying as "middle class".

The main distinguishing feature of the upper class is its ability to derive enormous incomes from wealth through techniques such as money management and investing, rather than engaging in wage-labor salaried employment, although most upper-class individuals today will still hold some sort of employment, which differs from historical norms. Successful entrepreneurs, CEOs, politicians, investment bankers, venture capitalists, heirs to fortunes, celebrities, and a few number of professionals, are considered members of this class by contemporary sociologists, such as James Henslin or Dennis Gilbert. There may be prestige differences between different upper-class households. An A-list actor, for example, might not be accorded as much prestige as a former U.S. President, yet all members of this class are so influential and wealthy as to be considered members of the upper class. At the pinnacle of U.S wealth, 2004 saw a dramatic increase in the numbers of billionaires. According to Forbes Magazine, there are now 374 U.S. billionaires. The growth in billionaires took a dramatic leap since the early 1980s, when the average net worth of the individuals on the Forbes 400 list was $400 million. Today, the average net worth is $2.8 billion.

Since the 1970s income inequality in the United States has been increasing, with the top 1% (largely because of the top 0.1%) experiencing significantly larger gains in income than the rest of society. Alan Greenspan, former chair of the Federal Reserve, sees it as a problem for society, calling it a "very disturbing trend".

According to the book Who Rules America? by William Domhoff, the distribution of wealth in America is the primary highlight of the influence of the upper class. The top 1% of Americans own around 34% of the wealth in the U.S. while the bottom 80% own only approximately 16% of the wealth. This large disparity displays the unequal distribution of wealth in America in absolute terms.

In 1998, Bob Herbert of The New York Times referred to modern American plutocrats as "The Donor Class" (list of top donors) and defined the class, for the first time, as "a tiny group – just one-quarter of 1 percent of the population – and it is not representative of the rest of the nation. But its money buys plenty of access".

See also

 Amakudari (Japan)
 Aristocracy (class)
 Bildungsbürgertum
 Black elite
 Corporate class
 Debutante
 Donor Class
 Fat cat (term)
 Gentry
 Grand Burgher (German Großbürger)
 High society (social class)
 Honour
 International Debutante Ball
 La Distinction
 Landed gentry
 Mentifact
 Nobility
 Nouveau riche
 Old money
 Paradise Papers
 Patrician (post-Roman Europe)
 Social status
 Socialite
 High-net-worth individual
 Ultra high-net-worth individual

References

Further reading
 Cousin, Bruno and Sébastien Chauvin (2021). "Is there a global super-bourgeoisie?" Sociology Compass, vol. 15, issue 6, pp. 1-15. online

 
 
 McKibbin, Ross.(2000) Classes and Cultures: England 1918-1951 (2000) pp 1–43.
 Baraka, Magda. (1998). The Egyptian upper class between revolutions, 1919-1952. ISBS.
 Scott, John. (1982). The upper classes: Property and privilege in Britain Macmillan Pub Ltd.

United States

 Baltzell, E. Digby. Philadelphia Gentlemen: The Making of a New Upper Class (1958).
 Brooks, David. Bobos in paradise: The new upper class and how they got there (2010) 
 Burt, Nathaniel. The Perennial Philadelphians: The Anatomy of an American Aristocracy (1999).
 Davis, Donald F. "The Price of Conspicious [sic] Production: The Detroit Elite and the Automobile Industry, 1900-1933." Journal of Social History 16.1 (1982): 21–46. online
 Farnum, Richard. "Prestige in the Ivy League: Democratization and discrimination at Penn and Columbia, 1890-1970." in Paul W. Kingston and Lionel S. Lewis, eds. The high-status track: Studies of elite schools and stratification (1990).
 Ghent, Jocelyn Maynard, and Frederic Cople Jaher. "The Chicago Business Elite: 1830–1930. A Collective Biography." Business History Review 50.3 (1976): 288–328. online
 Hood. Clifton. In Pursuit of Privilege: A History of New York City's Upper Class and the Making of a Metropolis (2016). Covers 1760–1970.
 Jaher, Frederic Cople, ed. The Rich, the Well Born, and the Powerful: Elites and Upper Classes in History (1973), essays by scholars
 Jaher, Frederick Cople. The Urban Establishment: Upper Strata in Boston, New York, Chicago, Charleston, and Los Angeles (1982).
 Jensen, Richard. "Family, Career, and Reform: Women Leaders of the Progressive Era." in Michael Gordon, ed., The American Family in Social-Historical Perspective,(1973): 267–80.
 
 McConachie, Bruce A. "New York operagoing, 1825-50: creating an elite social ritual." American Music (1988): 181–192.  online
 
 Story, Ronald. (1980) The forging of an aristocracy: Harvard & the Boston upper class, 1800-1870
 Synnott, Marcia. The half-opened door: Discrimination and admissions at Harvard, Yale, and Princeton, 1900-1970 (2010).
 Williams, Peter W. Religion, Art, and Money: Episcopalians and American Culture from the Civil War to the Great Depression (2016), especially in New York City

External links

Number of households with net-worths over one million dollars
Relationship between income and education
"The Aristocracy – how the ruling class survives" on BBC Radio 4's In Our Time featuring David Cannadine, Rosemary Sweet and Felipe Fernandez-Armesto

 
Social classes
High society (social class)